Isobe Station may refer to either of the following train stations in Japan:

 Isobe Station (Gunma) of JR East
 Isobe Station (Ishikawa) of Hokuriku Railway
 Shima-Isobe Station of Kintetsu